Government of Tamil Nadu is the subnational government for the Indian state of Tamil Nadu. It is seated at Fort St George, Chennai. The legislature of Tamil Nadu was bicameral until 1986, when it was replaced by a unicameral legislature, like most other states in India.

Structure 
The Governor is the constitutional head of state while the Chief Minister heads the council of ministers. The Chief Justice of the Madras High Court is the head of the judiciary.

Officials 
M. K. Stalin is the Chief Minister of Tamil Nadu. Munishwar Nath Bhandari is the acting Chief Justice of Madras High Court. The Chief Secretary is V. Irai Anbu, IAS.

Administrative divisions 
The state of Tamil Nadu has a population of 72,138,959 as per the 2011 Census and covers an area of 130,058 km2. The major administrative units of the state constitute 38 districts, 76 revenue divisions, 220 taluks, 21 municipal corporations, 150 municipalities, 385 panchayat unions (blocks), 561 town panchayats and 12,524 village panchayats.

E-governance 
The Tamil Nadu E-Governance Agency is the entity that facilitates e-governance efforts in Tamil Nadu. As part of the e-governance initiative, a large part of government records like land ownership records have been digitised. All major administrative offices like local governance bodies and various government departments have been computerised.

Council of Ministers

See also 
Legislature of Tamil Nadu
Chief Ministers of Tamil Nadu
Governors of Tamil Nadu
Tamil Nadu Council of Ministers
Government of Tamil Nadu Departments
Tamil Nadu Government Organizations
Government of India
Tamil Nadu Government Laws & Rules
M. K. Stalin Ministry

References

External links 

Tamil Nadu e-Governance Official website